Robert Moffatt (1873–?) was a Scottish footballer who played in the Football League for Manchester City.

References

1873 births
Date of death unknown
Scottish footballers
English Football League players
Association football midfielders
St Mirren F.C. players
Manchester City F.C. players
Kilmarnock F.C. players